Checheng is a railway station on the Taiwan Railways Administration (TRA) Jiji line located in Shuili Township, Nantou County, Taiwan.

History
The station was originally established on 14 January 1922 as Waichecheng Station. It was then renamed to Checheng in 1961.

Around the station
 Mingtan Dam
This is the closest railway station to the Sun Moon Lake scenic area. Regular buses operate between Sun Moon Lake and Shuili Township.

See also
 List of railway stations in Taiwan

References

1922 establishments in Taiwan
Railway stations in Nantou County
Railway stations opened in 1922
Railway stations served by Taiwan Railways Administration